Geneviève Darrieussecq (born 4 March 1956) is a French physician and politician of Democratic Movement (MoDem) who has been serving as Minister for People with Disabilities in the government of Prime Minister Élisabeth Borne since 2022.

From 2017 to 2022, Darrieussecq served as the Secretary of State to the Minister of the Armed Forces in the governments of successive Prime Ministers Édouard Philippe and Jean Castex.

Career

Career in local politics
Darrieussecq was the mayor of Mont-de-Marsan (2008-2017).

Career in national politics
In 2010, François Bayrou included Darrieussecq in his shadow cabinet; in this capacity, Darrieussecq served as opposition counterpart to Minister of Health Roselyne Bachelot ahead of the 2012 French presidential election.

In the Republicans' 2016 presidential primary, Darrieussecq endorsed Alain Juppé as the party's candidate for the 2017 French presidential election.

In 2017 Darrieussecq was elected to the National Assembly from Landes's 1st constituency.

On 21 June 2017 Darrieussecq was appointed Secretary of State to the Minister of the Armed Forces Florence Parly in the Second Philippe government. Fabien Lainé succeeded her in the National Assembly and Charles Dayot succeeded her as mayor of Mont-de-Marsan (on 7 July 2017). Contexte's newspaper notes that "Geneviève Darrieussecq is discreet with Florence Parly at the Ministry of the Armed Forces. She had a specific mission letter: to her "the human", when the minister takes care of the material. The memory, the youth, the training, the service of health of the armies, the durable development in the armies, the family plan are her first subjects of concern. But she must keep abreast of the rest, to be able to answer in case of Florence Parly's absence.

References

1956 births
Living people
Members of the Borne government
Deputies of the 15th National Assembly of the French Fifth Republic
21st-century French women politicians
Women government ministers of France
Members of the Regional Council of Nouvelle-Aquitaine
Democratic Movement (France) politicians
Politicians from Nouvelle-Aquitaine
20th-century French physicians
Women members of the National Assembly (France)
Women mayors of places in France
University of Bordeaux alumni
20th-century French women
Mayors of places in Nouvelle-Aquitaine